Maria Toribia (died 1175) was a Spanish peasant woman who is believed to have married Saint Isidore.  She is known in Spain as Santa María de la Cabeza (Saint Mary of the Head).

Life
Maria's date of birth is unknown, but it was sometime near the end of the 11th century or at the beginning of the 12th century. She is believed to have been born in Caraquiz, a little village close to Uceda, in the current-day Spanish province of Guadalajara. She subsequently lived in Torrelaguna, in current-day Madrid Province. There, she met and married Isidore, a simple farmer from Madrid (who, according to some sources, had fled there as a result of the Almoravid invasion), with whom she had her only son, Illan.  According to legend, the child one day fell down a deep well, leaving the parents with no recourse but prayer. Miraculously, the water level suddenly rose to the level of the ground, and the floating baby was easily rescued unharmed. As a result of this, she and her husband committed themselves to sexual abstinence as a form of devotion, and, from that time on, lived in different homes. Their son later died in infancy.

One story relates that Maria always kept a pot of stew on the fireplace in their humble rural dwelling. She knew that her husband Isidore would often bring home anyone who was hungry. One day he brought home more hungry people than usual. After she served many of them, Maria told him that there simply was no more stew in the pot. He insisted that she check the pot again, and she was able to spoon out enough stew to feed them all.

Life during the Middle Ages was not easy for women. Saint Mary of the Head was responsible for household chores and rigorous farming activities. She heavily relied on the support of her husband.

Torribia substantially outlived her husband, who died in 1130. After his death, she lived as a hermit, performed miracles, and had visions. For instance, legend suggests that every night she dreamed of the Virgin Mary, who would cross the Jarama River while extending her pure cloak over the waters.

Veneration
After Isidore's death, Maria became a hermit, but she too performed miracles and merited after her death the byname "of the Head", because the relic of her head (conserved in a reliquary and carried in procession) has often brought rain from heaven to dry countrysides.

After being moved several times, her relics were eventually gathered in 1769 at the Real Colegiata de San Isidro in Madrid where they remain for public veneration. They are placed with the uncorrupted body of her husband. She was beatified by Pope Innocent XII on 11 August 1697.

Revered by farm workers throughout the Catholic world, Saint Mary of the Head shares both a commemoration with her husband on 15 May, and has an own feast on 9 September.

Legacy

Despite the centuries that have passed since she lived, Isidore and María continue to be strong examples of the vocational meaning of marriage, not only as an institution that addresses a need for affection or continue a family bloodline, but also as a vocation through which people can achieve holiness. This example of holiness in marriage is demonstrated by her love of Lord,
love of the Blessed Virgin Mary (most of all in her invocations of Madrid’s Almudena and Atocha), and her love of family. Since the thirteenth century, la Real Congregación de San Isidro has promoted and spread this concept and example of holy matrimony set by St. Mary of the Head and St. Isidore.

In July 2011, three rural churches in the Diocese of Rochester, NY were combined into one parish now known as Ss. Isidore and Maria Torribia Parish. According to Father Patrick Connor, pastor, the new parish title was selected from among 30 names submitted by parishioners and religious-education students. The new name is highly appropriate since Isidore and Maria Torribia are the patron saints of farmers and rural communities and the central Steuben area is mostly rural. Father Connor said the title of Ss. Isidore and Maria Torribia carries significant meaning, even though not all parishioners are farmers or live in rural settings. "We all benefit from the labor of farmers, who provide us with food. So Isidore and Maria can remind us to be grateful and supportive of those who put food on our tables," he remarked.

References

External links
Site detailing a church in Avila named after Saint Maria de la Cabeza (Spanish)

1175 deaths
Burials in Madrid
People from the Province of Guadalajara
12th-century people from León and Castile
Spanish beatified people
12th-century Spanish women